State Route 181 (SR 181) is a  route in the US state of Maine from SR 180 near Mariaville to SR 9 in Amherst. It serves as the main through route through Mariaville.

Major junctions

References

External links

Floodgap Roadgap's RoadsAroundME: Maine State Route 181

181
Transportation in Hancock County, Maine